Salticella is a genus of flies belonging to the family Sciomyzidae.

The species of this genus are found in Europe and Southern Africa.

Species:
 Salticella fasciata (Meigen, 1830) 
 Salticella stuckenbergi Verbeke, 1962

References

Sciomyzidae